Amar Suhagin is a Bhojpuri film released in 1978 directed by Babubhai Mistri. It stars Upendra Trivedi, Snehlata Gadkari, Padma Khanna. The music is composed by S.N. Tripathi.

Cast
Upendra Trivedi
Snehlata Gadkari
Padma Khanna
Tun Tun
Amjad Khan

References

External links

1978 films
1970s Bhojpuri-language films
Films directed by Babubhai Mistry